The Unwritten Law is a 1929 British short crime film directed by Sinclair Hill, and made at Wembley Studios in the De Forest Phonofilm sound-on-film system.

Cast
 Rosalinde Fuller as The Wife 
 Ion Swinley as The Sweetheart  
 Robert Bruce as Policeman 
 Edwin M. Robson as Villager 
 Pat Williams as Villager

References

Bibliography
 Low, Rachael, History of the British Film, 1918-1929 (George Allen & Unwin, 1971)

External links

1929 films
1929 crime films
1920s English-language films
British crime films
Films shot at Wembley Studios
Films directed by Sinclair Hill
British black-and-white films
1920s British films